The Communauté tarifaire vaudoise, also known by its marketing name mobilis, is a Swiss tariff network covering the whole of the canton of Vaud.

References

External links 
mobilis web site

Transport in the canton of Vaud